La Paz (IPA: [lɐ 'pas]), officially the Municipality of La Paz, is a 5th class municipality in the province of Leyte, Philippines. According to the 2020 census, it has a population of 19,174 people.

History

In the 1870s, a sitio was formed, and a chapel was built there before 1886. The chapel was called "rosaryohan." Spanish missionaries visited this place to teach the natives the doctrine. However, the people had to go to Dulag for the Holy Week and days of obligation in order to attend mass.

Until then, the sitio was named Cabadyangan. When the question of official name came up, the people unanimously selected the name "La Paz", in honor of their patroness, Nuestra Señora De La Paz y Buen Viaje (Our Lady of Peace and Good Voyage).

The first hermano mayor was Victoriano Relano in 1908 when the first celebration of the fiesta in honor of the "Nuestra Señora de la Paz y Buen Viaje" was held.

In 1903, La Paz was made a barrio of Burauen. Capitan Estefanio de Paz was the first teniente del barrio. Three leaders went to Manila to petition to the central government to raise La Paz to the status of a municipality. Don Nicasio Martinez Vivero a Man from Tolosa, Leyte and a Educator in La Paz on that time was one of the Three leaders. With the help of provincial leaders, La Paz was declared a fourth class town in 1918. After the Township Declaration, Lapaznons gathered their First Elections, and they Elect Nicasio Vivero as the First Municipal President (Mayor) of La Paz.

On July 14, 1942, the Japanese forces invaded La Paz. A company of soldiers occupied the town with their garrison at the central school building. Because guerrillas constantly harassed them, the troops stayed in La Paz for only three weeks. However, one month later, more troops came. They constructed strong trenches around the school site. The Japanese abolished existing political parties and formed the "Kalibapi." They organized the local government and appointed a puppet mayor.

Atty. Pedro Kahano Palaña, Jr., The Son-In Law of Nicasio Vivero and also a Native of Tolosa, Leyte was the Puppet Mayor of La Paz, Leyte after he was Captured by the Japanese Soldiers together with Nicasio’s Two Children, Antonio Lubin and Maria Salud. Palaña served as a Mayor until the end of World War 2.

The Japanese tried to control the whole population of La Paz and organized the neighborhood associations in the poblacion as well as in the barrios. Schools were opened with emphasis on Nihongo, the Japanese language and the Asiatic ideologies.

Guerrillas infiltrated the town to learn about the enemy strength that was considered important information for the coming liberation. Many La Paznons risked their lives on these dangerous missions. In 1944, La Paz was liberated.

Geography

Barangays
La Paz (formerly a barangay of Burauen in the province of Leyte). La Paz is constitutional ruled by Spaniards in 1918. La Paz is politically subdivided into 35 barangays.

Climate

Demographics

Economy

References

External links
 [ Philippine Standard Geographic Code]
Philippine Census Information
Local Governance Performance Management System

Municipalities of Leyte (province)